The U.S. state of Mississippi's at-large congressional district existed from December 10, 1817, when it was admitted to the Union until 1847, when representatives were elected in districts.

Mississippi briefly elected an at-large representative from 1853 to 1855, in addition to having the rest of the delegation elected from districts.

List of representatives

1817–1855: One seat, then two, then four, then none, then one

Notes

References

 Congressional Biographical Directory of the United States 1774–present
 

AL
Former congressional districts of the United States
At-large United States congressional districts
Constituencies established in 1817
1817 establishments in Mississippi
Constituencies disestablished in 1847
1847 disestablishments in Mississippi
Constituencies established in 1853
1853 establishments in Mississippi
Constituencies disestablished in 1855
1855 disestablishments in Mississippi